Route 107 is a numbered State Highway running  in Rhode Island, United States. The route serves the town of Burrillville and connects Route 100 with Route 102.

Route description
Route 107 begins in the village of Pascoag as Pascoag Main Street heading northeast. It soon reaches the village of Harrisville, entering along Chapel Street. Route 107 intersects Route 98 in the center of the village then leaves east along East Avenue. Route 107 soon intersects Route 102 (Bronco Highway) and continues for another block to end at Victory Highway, which is an old alignment of Route 102 that is still state-maintained.

History
Before 1934, Route 107 was on the opposite side of the State.  Originally, Route 107 started at the junction of present-day Route 3 and Route 138 in Richmond.  From there, it went east along Route 138 then south along Route 108 to end at U.S. Route 1 (US 1). At the time, modern Route 107 was unnumbered.

Major intersections

References

External links

2019 Highway Map, Rhode Island

107
Transportation in Providence County, Rhode Island